Allen Taylor & Company is a company in Australia, which is a subsidiary of Boral Timber. The company was founded by Allen Arthur Taylor in 1893, based at Rozelle.

By the time Taylor was knighted in 1911, he was on the board of numerous companies. He was an Alderman and Mayor of the Annandale Borough, an Alderman and Lord Mayor of Sydney Municipal Council and a Member of the NSW Legislative Council. Three early Presscopy Letter books of Allen Taylor and Co are in the Noel Butlin Archives at the ANU .

The company once owned a number of ships as part of its timber business.

Former ships

Notes

Shipbuilding companies of Australia